The Deh Gáh Got'ı̨ę First Nation is a Dene First Nations band government in the Northwest Territories. The band is headquartered in the community of Fort Providence, where 799 of its registered members live.

The Deh Gáh Got'ı̨ę First Nation belongs to the Dehcho First Nations.

References

First Nations in the Northwest Territories
Dene governments